The Heart of Eternity is a diamond measuring 27.64 carats (5.528 g), rated in color as "Fancy Vivid Blue" by the Gemological Institute of America. The Heart of Eternity was cut by the Steinmetz Group, who owned the diamond before selling it to the De Beers Group.

The Heart of Eternity is a member of an exceedingly rare class of coloured diamonds. It was found in the Premier Diamond Mine of South Africa. The Premier mine is the only mine in the world with an appreciable production of blue diamonds.

The Heart of Eternity was unveiled in January 2000 as part of the De Beers Millennium Jewels collection, which included the Millennium Star. The Heart of Eternity was featured with ten other blue diamonds; the collection of blue diamonds totalled 118 carats (23.6 g). The De Beers Millennium Jewels were displayed at London's Millennium Dome throughout 2000. An attempt on 7 November 2000 to steal the collection was foiled.

In 2012, there have been rumors that the boxer Floyd Mayweather Jr. bought the Heart of Eternity necklace for his fiancée, Shantel Jackson. De Beers refused to say whom they sold the Heart of Eternity Diamond to, and so its current owner was left unknown.

Popular culture
The Heart of Eternity is the gem from which takes its inspiration the famous Heart of the Ocean, the blue heart-shaped diamond held by Rose, the protagonist in the iconic film Titanic.

See also
 List of diamonds

Notes

References
 Gemological Institute of America. "The Heart of Eternity".
 The World of Famous Diamonds. "Famous Diamonds: The Heart of Eternity".
 Smithsonian Museum of Natural History. "The Splendor of Diamonds" . Retrieved 12 April 2005.

Blue diamonds
De Beers
Diamonds originating in South Africa
Individual diamonds